William Cummings (13 March 1889 – 28 May 1955) was a New Zealand rugby union player. A loose forward, Cummings represented  at a provincial level, and was a member of the New Zealand national side, the All Blacks, in 1913 and 1921. He played three matches for the All Blacks including two internationals, scoring one try.

Cummings died in Christchurch on 28 May 1955, and was buried at Bromley Cemetery.

References

1889 births
1955 deaths
Rugby union players from Timaru
New Zealand rugby union players
New Zealand international rugby union players
Canterbury rugby union players
Rugby union flankers
Burials at Bromley Cemetery